Hermann "Mandi" Urbas (born 18 June 1982) is a German former professional footballer who played as a midfielder.

Career
Born in Munich, Urbas began his career with Bayern Munich, moving to 1860 Munich at the age of 9. He then signed for SpVgg Unterhaching after getting in trouble with 1860 Munich's youth management. He played for the club's second team alongside American player Taylor Twellman, who helped him find an agent for a move to the United States, where he spent the 2003 season playing in Major League Soccer with the Dallas Burn, making three appearances. He left the club and returned to SpVgg Unterhaching II, combining his football career with a job as a retail salesman.

Personal life
Urbas also holds American citizenship.

References

1982 births
Living people
German people of American descent
German footballers
Association football midfielders
FC Bayern Munich footballers
TSV 1860 Munich players
SpVgg Unterhaching players
SpVgg Unterhaching II players
FC Dallas players
Major League Soccer players
German expatriate footballers
German expatriate sportspeople in the United States
Expatriate soccer players in the United States
Footballers from Munich